Nicos Anastasiades (born 27 September 1946) is a Greek Cypriot politician who served as the seventh president of Cyprus from 2013 to 2023. He was first elected in 2013, and then re-elected in 2018. Previously, he was the leader of Democratic Rally between 1997 and 2013 and served as Member of Parliament from Limassol between 1981 and 2013.

Education
Anastasiades is a lawyer by profession, and the founder of law firm "Nicos Chr. Anastasiades & Partners". He graduated in law from the National and Kapodistrian University of Athens and completed postgraduate studies in shipping law at the University of London. During his university studies, he was a member of the Centre Coalition based in Athens formed by Georgios Papandreou.

Political career
Anastasiades was first elected to the House of Representatives in 1981 with the Democratic Rally and remained an MP until 2013, when he resigned in order to assume his duties as President of the Cyprus. He was the leader of his party from 1997 to 2013.

President of Cyprus

In March 2012, Nicos Anastasiades was nominated as a candidate for the 2013 presidential election, against his rival MEP Eleni Theocharous in a vote among the 1,008 strong executive of the Democratic Rally. Nicos Anastasiades received 673 votes (86.73%) and Theocharous received 103 (13.27%). In the first round of the presidential election on 17 February 2013, Anastasiades won 45% of votes, while Stavros Malas and George Lillikas earned 26.9% and 24.9%, respectively. He won in the second round against Malas with 57.48% of the vote and was sworn in as president on 28 February 2013.

Cutting public spending
He pledged to implement the Structural Reforms demanded by the European Commission in order to obtain economic aid and cut social benefits, pensions and wages in the public and private sectors, while increasing VAT and fuel taxes. He also decided to reduce the number of civil servants.

Bank bail-out
Anastasiades had to break campaign promises by agreeing to let the banks confiscate 47.5 percent of bank accounts over 100,000 euros in 2013, in order to acquire a 10-billion euro bailout from international lenders.

Speaking before a committee of inquiry into the island's economic collapse, Anastasiades conceded he reneged on his pledges not to accept a "haircut" on deposits, stressing that the alternative would have been catastrophic for Cyprus.

He later came to comment that Cyprus was treated as a guinea pig with extreme measures never applied before, but despite his counter-proposals they were all blatantly rejected during the Eurogroup meeting. However, such claims were heavily criticized on the press for being misleading, citing references from Eurogroup's members who stated that the bailout plan was actually Anastasiades's proposal. Additional criticism was due to claims that the president himself warned his associates and friends to move money abroad before financial crisis hit.

Despite the heavy criticism, the government's effective management of capital controls, however, revived the country's banking system, and Cyprus was able to exit the bailout in 2016.

Military conscription

During his electoral campaign for the post of Cyprus President in 2013, he announced his commitment to reduce military conscription in Cyprus to 14 months during the first hundred days of his term. During the early months of the Anastasiades administration there was important planning for the reduction of military conscription to 14 months in order to increase the incentive for 18 year olds to serve their conscription and to reduce the financial burden to the Cypriot state. Minister of Defence Fotis Fotiou announced that there would be a final decision on the reduction of military conscription towards late 2013. There was increasing pressure for ending military conscription due to the 2012–13 Cypriot financial crisis.

In early August 2013, Minister of Defence Fotis Fotiou announced the reduction of military service, which was in the electoral manifesto of Anastasiades. He supported that national service will be reduced to 18 months in the first phase and decrease further to 14 months before the end of 2014. On 25 February 2016, it was decided by the cabinet to reduce the military service to 18 months for all conscripts who joined in the summer of 2015, and to reduce the service to 14 months for all those who joined thereafter.

Cyprus dispute

Anastasiades supported the Annan Plan, even though a majority (61%) of his party voted it down. Some of his intra-party opposition even called for Anastasiades to step down. Many party cadres were up in arms over Anastasiades' letter to the European Parliament alleging that the government trampled on free speech and human rights during the referendum's "Yes" campaign. The government cited the National Television Council's data that showed that the six parties supporting the "No" vote got as much air time as the two that supported the UN plan. The start of peace negotiations between Nicos Anastasiades and his Turkish Cypriot counterpart began in October 2013, attracting the interest of international media and world leaders including Barack Obama.

Golden visas and links to money-laundering
On 3 November 2019, newspapers reported that under Nicos Anastasiades' government, the Malaysian conman and fugitive, Jho Low, had been granted Cypriot citizenship. It was reported that Jho Low obtained the passport under the Cypriot citizenship investment scheme just two days after investing in some property in Cyprus. At the time, there was no warrant against Jho Low for the 1MDB scandal; however, he was already under investigation and investigators were closing in on him for his alleged money-laundering activities. He was granted a passport despite the fact that a background check on him raised several red flags because of his status as a politically exposed person as well as his alleged fraud and regulatory breaches. It was also revealed that while the golden passport scheme normally requires applicants to live in the country for at least seven years, as well as buy property, the decision to override this requirement was taken by the country's cabinet. The revelation concerning Jho Low's Cypriot citizenship came after the Cypriot citizenship investment scheme came under scrutiny, after it was revealed that the Cyprus government, under the presidency of Nicos Anastasiades, had granted citizenship to Cambodian elites.

In August 2019, an OCCRP report linked President Anastasiades' Law firm, which he co-owned and from which he stepped away just as he was ascending to the presidency in 2013, with "business deals linked to a friend of Russian President Vladimir Putin, the infamous Magnitsky scandal, and a network of companies used in various financial crimes." Both of President Anastasiades' daughters are still partners in the firm, and he still has a private office in the building. The report revealed that Anastasiades' Law firm "executed complex deals that moved Russian money to and from shell companies created by and associated with the firm", two of which appear to be deeply entwined with the Troika Laundromat.
There is a clear link between Nikos Anastasiades and the golden passports scheme since he chaired the Cabinet which offered these passports.

Professionalisation of the National Guard
As part of the professionalisation of the National Guard, President Anastasiades introduced the contracted soldiers "Συμβασιούχοι Οπλίτες (ΣΥΟΠ)" whose role is to mainly cover the operational needs of the National Guard now that the military service was reduced to up to 14 months, an initiative which has been considered to be successful.

Personal and family life
He married Andri Moustakoudi in 1971 and they have two daughters. He has a twin brother and a sister. Anastasiades' family has been twice linked with visa schemes. In 2001, his twin brother, Pambos Anastasiades, was sentenced to 18 months in prison for his role in a work permit scandal, which was about forging "pink visas", i.e. work permits for foreign women employed in illegal brothels.

Suspicions of tax evasion 
In October 2021, his name was mentioned in the Pandora papers.

Distinctions

 First Vice-president of the delegation of the House to the EU-Cyprus Joint Parliamentary Committee (JPC). 
 Leader of the delegation of the House to the Association of Asian Parliaments for Peace (Asian Parliamentary Assembly (APA) since 2008). 
 Leader of the delegation of the House to the Parliamentary Assembly of the Mediterranean (PAM). 
 Leader of the delegation of the House to the Euro-Mediterranean Parliamentary Assembly (EMPA) (Parliamentary Assembly of the Union for the Mediterranean since 2010).
 Leader of the delegation of the House to the Euro-Mediterranean Parliamentary Assembly (EMPA) (Parliamentary Assembly of the Union for the Mediterranean since 2010).
 Vice-president of the executive committee of the Cyprus Group to the Inter-Parliamentary Union (IPU). 
 Member of the delegation of the House to the Parliamentary Assembly of the Union for the Mediterranean and of the delegation of the House to the Asian Parliamentary Assembly (APA).

Honours and awards
 Greek Orthodox Patriarchate of Jerusalem: Knight Grand Cross of the Order of the Orthodox Crusaders of the Holy Sepulchre (7 May 2013)
 : Collar of the Order of Manuel Amador Guerrero (23 July 2013)
 : Order of Sheikh Isa bin Salman Al Khalifa (9 March 2015)
 : Grand Collar of the Order of the Redeemer (30 March 2015)
 : Grand Collar of the Order of the Nile (20 November 2017)
 Greek Orthodox Patriarchate of Alexandria: Knight Grand Cross of the Order of Saint Mark (1 May 2018)
 : Grand Cross of the Order of the Republic of Serbia (10 May 2018)
 Serbian Orthodox Church: Order of St. Sava (10 May 2018)
 : Order for Exceptional Merits (9 January 2019)
 : Grand Cross of the Order of the White Eagle (4 October 2021)
 : Order of the Golden Fleece (9 November 2021)
 : Grand Cordon of the Supreme Order of the Renaissance (17 December 2021)
 : Grand Collar of the Order of Pope Pius IX (25 October 2022)
 : President's Medal (10 November 2022)

See also
 European People's Party
 Reduction of military conscription in Cyprus

References

External links
 
 

|-

1946 births
21st-century presidents of Cyprus
20th-century Cypriot lawyers
Democratic Rally politicians
Leaders of political parties in Cyprus
Living people
Alumni of the University of London
Members of the House of Representatives (Cyprus)
People from Limassol